The Government Medical College, Kadapa (formerly known as Rajiv Gandhi Institute of Medical Sciences) is located in Putlampally village, near Kadapa City. It is affiliated to NTR University of Health Sciences.

History

Earlier, the hospital was a secondary level care hospital i.e., District Hospital, located within Kadapa city. Later it was converted into tertiary level care hospital and named it as Rajiv Gandhi Institute of Medical Sciences, Kadapa.
This college was founded by the Government of Andhra Pradesh in 2006. It was inaugurated on 27 September 2006 by the then UPA Chair Person Smt. Sonia Gandhi. This medical institute started functioning from 1 August 2006.

Intake

The present intake of this institute is 175 seats

This prestigious institute also provides MD/MS SEATS in various speciality courses..
MD Physiology- 2 seats,
MS Anatomy   - 2 seats,
MS ENT       - 3 seats,
MS Ophthalmology- 3 seats,
MS Obstetrics and gynaecology      - 7 seats,
MD Dermatology - 2 seats,
MD Anesthesia  - 2 seats,
MS Generalsurgery- 3 seats,
MD General medicine - 12 seats.

The current Chief Minister Of Andhra Pradesh, honourable YS Jaganmohan reddy laid the foundation stone for YSR cancer hospital block, superspeciality hospital, Psychiatry hospital block, LV prasad eye institute on 23 December 2019 in this institute.

References

Medical colleges in Andhra Pradesh
Universities and colleges in Kadapa district
2006 establishments in Andhra Pradesh
Educational institutions established in 2006